Malony v. Adsit, 175 U.S. 281 (1899), is a United States Supreme Court case involving a land lot in the city of Juneau, Alaska. In resolving the land dispute it was held that a bill of exceptions could only be considered if authenticated by the judge who sat on the trial.

Background 
In 1891, O. H. Adsit had been ejected from a land lot he had taken possession of in 1881. In 1896, he filed suit in the district court to recover possession of the tract. Adsit claimed ownership on grounds of prior occupancy and actual possession at the time of the ejectment. The defendant, John Malony, filed a demurrer. He argued that the stated facts did not constitute a sufficient cause of action. The district court held in favor of Adsit, and Malony appealed to the Supreme Court.

Prior to his appeal, Malony had filed a bill of exceptions in the trial court. This bill allows for either party to state in writing any objections to the decision of the court on a point of law. The object of the bill is to put the question of law on record for the information of the court of error having cognizance of such cause. At the time of the filing, the judge who presided over the trial had been succeeded on the bench, and the new judge allowed and signed the bill.

Opinion of the Court 
Justice George Shiras Jr. delivered the opinion of the Court. Malony had filed a bill of exceptions in the trial court which had not been signed by the judge who sat on the trial. Shiras concluded that a bill of exceptions which had not been authenticated by the presiding judge could not be considered by the appellate court. Since Malony's demurrer had been overruled, and the bill of exceptions filed was void, the Court had to rule on the facts as presented by the lower court. The judgment of the district court was affirmed.

Subsequent developments 
In 1900, Congress amended the law to allow, in certain cases, for the signature of another judge to suffice as authentication. Section 953 of the Revised Statutes, as amended by the Act of June 5, 1900, c. 717, 31 Stat. 270, 28 U.S.C. § 776 (28 USCA § 776).  Both Adsit and Delaney later became mayors of Juneau.

External links 

1899 in United States case law
United States Supreme Court cases
United States Supreme Court cases of the Fuller Court
1899 in Alaska
Juneau, Alaska